Notable Slovak football transfers in the winter transfer window 2017–18 by club. Only transfers of the Fortuna Liga and 2. Liga are included.

Fortuna Liga

FC Spartak Trnava

In:

Out:

MŠK Žilina

In:

Out:

ŠK Slovan Bratislava

In:

Out:

FC DAC 1904 Dunajská Streda

In:

Out:

MFK Ružomberok

In:

Out:

AS Trenčín

In:

Out:

FC Nitra

In:

Out:

FC ViOn Zlaté Moravce

In:

Out:

MFK Zemplín Michalovce

In:

Out:

FK Železiarne Podbrezová

In:

Out:

1. FC Tatran Prešov

In:

Out:

FK Senica

In:

Out:

2. liga

MFK Skalica

In:

Out:

ŠKF Sereď

In:

Out:

FC Lokomotíva Košice

In:

Out:

MŠK Žilina B

In:

Out:

FK Poprad

In:

Out:

FK Spišská Nová Ves

In:

Out:

MFK Tatran Liptovský Mikuláš

In:

Out:

Partizán Bardejov

In:

Out:

MFK Lokomotíva Zvolen

In:

Out:

FK Pohronie

In:

Out:

FC ŠTK 1914 Šamorín

In:

Out:

FK Slavoj Trebišov

In:

Out:

AFC Nové Mesto nad Váhom

In:

Out:

FK Inter Bratislava

In:

Out:

KFC Komárno

In:

Out:

FK Železiarne Podbrezová B

In:

Out:

03000

References

Transfers
2017-18
Slovakia